Carolina Alexandra Falkholt, with the pseudonym Blue, born 4 March 1977 in Gothenburg, is a Swedish artist, graffiti writer and musician. Sometimes she uses her own coined term grafitta, to describe her art. It is a play with the two words graffiti and fitta, the latter means "pussy" in Swedish but also with a Swedish grammatical habit of setting a gender to work titles where an "a" denotes female role.

Biography 
Carolina Falkholt grew up in Dals Långed, Dalsland, Sweden. As a teenager, she moved to Stockholm to go to the waldorf school Kristofferskolan. At the same time she began painting graffiti under the pseudonym Blue. By the mid-1990s, she moved to New York City. There, as the only Swedish artist, she became a member of the two crews The Fantastic Partners and Hardcore Chickz. She worked with graffiti writers such as Sento and Lady Pink while making paintings around New York for the record company Rawkus to earn a living. Around the turn of the century, she was one of Sweden's most famous graffiti writers. After four years In New York, she moved back to Sweden and settled in Gothenburg where she is active today.

Artistic practice 
In addition to spray paint and drawing, Carolina Falkholt practice involve collage, sculpture, installation, performance, film and photo. She often build up her drawings with endless amounts of circles creating a web, sometimes over vibrant colors. Typical motifs she has been investigating in her art is connected to the body, like eyes, ears, mouth, hands and the vagina. In many of her paintings of hands it is actually letters, since she is using Swedish Sign Language in her art. She is also a musician and has released records as part of her artistic practice. In several projects she has initiated various forms of collaboration with other artists, musicians, the public and organizations.

In 2010, Falkholt realized the big project Graffiti Mariestad that circulated around a now demolished silo in Mariestad harbor. During a number of months before the building was to be dismantled, the façade was painted while activities in and around the silo were ongoing. The project involved about 30 graffiti writers, including Nug, Rubin and Dwane, musicians, dancers, artists and hundreds of young people. The project resulted in one of the world's largest graffiti paintings. The project Graffiti Mariestad also resulted in Falkholt being commissioned to create a public sculpture in Mariestad, which was built, among other things, from material from the demolished silo. The twelve-meter high sculpture  T.E.S.T. was inaugurated in June 2011. The whole process is documented in the book SILO.

Carolina Falkholt has had solo exhibitions at Gothenburg Museum of Art, Eskilstuna Museum of Art, Ystad Art Museum, Steneby Konsthall in Dalsland and Klippans konsthall in Skåne., among others. In 2013, she was one of the participants in Swedish Televisions (SVT) program Konstkuppen and that same year she curated and participated as an artist in the exhibition Mynningsladdare (Muzzleloader) at Röda Sten Konsthall in Gothenburg. In the same year, she participated in the X-Border biennial with the project Firewall with paintings in the three towns Severomorsk, Rovaniemi and Luleå and made the 16 meter long piece Wet Paint at Kulturhuset in Stockholm. Falkholt is represented by, among others, Gothenburg Museum of Art, Skövde Museum of Art and Halland Museum of Cultural History. In 2014 she made the painting Övermålning (Overpainting) as a commission for a highschool in Nyköping. She started by writing derogatory words towards women on the wall and then painted them over with a stylized motif of the lower part of a womans naked body. The artwork created a heated argument which was covered in media, both in Sweden and internationally. At one point politicians took the decision to build a wall in front of the painting. But Falholt and the painting had many strong supporters. The principal of the school said: "I see many pedagogic advantages to having her art in the school". After much debate the wall in front of the painting was taken down. In connection with this debate she made a performance at Konstakademien in Stockholm, where she invited politicians to Skenbröllop, a sham marriage with her. Two politicians said yes, Marita Ulvskog (Swedish Social Democratic Party) and Sissela Nordling Blanco (Feminist Initiative).

In 2015 she made a huge mural as a commission for the highschool Parkskolan in Ystad. The painting Untitled (Firewall), depict yet another stylized naked woman haning upside down with her legs in an unnatural contorted position. 2017 she was invited as one on the artist for the exhibition SculptureMotion at Wanås sculpture park, together with William Forsythe, Henrik Plenge Jakobsen, Sonia Khurana and Éva Mag. For this exhibition she did the work Train of thoughts, a railroad car moved to the woods, first painted white and then filled with her black circles creating an organic web over the whole surface.

In December 2017 she painted a 40-foot erect human penis on a building at 303 Broome Street, New York, NY. She signed the artwork on the lower right hand side. The mural was painted over by the buildings owner three days later.

Gallery

Public works (in selection) 
 Wall painting on the facade of Bengtsfors Sports Hall, Sweden, 2012
 Freedom of expression, Järnvägsgatan in Alingsås, Sweden, 2012
 Facade painting on a day-care building in Durres, Albania, 2013
 Untitled, Bergslagsvägen 43, Avesta, Sweden, 2013
 Pi, on the facade of the student house Jakten, Halmstad, Sweden, 2013
 Untitled (Firewall), Borås, Sweden, 2014
 Övermålning, Nyköping High School, Nyköping, Sweden, 2014 
 Untitled (Firewall), wall painting at Parkskolan in Ystad, Sweden, 2015
 Untitled (Firewall), wall painting, Södra Dragongatan in Ystad, Sweden, 2015
 Fountain, GrEEK Campus, Cairo, Egypt, 2015
 TECHNE, Mimers house of Culture, Kungälv, Sweden, 2016
 Fuck the World, Kungsholmen, Stockholm, Sweden, 2018

Fuck the World
Fuck the World is a mural by Falkholt which depicts an erect blue penis and covers five storeys of an apartment block in Stockholm, Sweden.

The work was unveiled in April 2018 on Kronobergsvägen in the Kungsholmen district of Stockholm. Falkholt whose work explores human sexuality said of it, "They should consider what it is they are so upset about and then talk about it"  and "Sex is so important, but it’s always been too dirty to discuss."

Falkholt was confident that Stockholm residents would be receptive to the work and that it would avoid the fate of an earlier work of a pink and orange penis which was painted on the side of a four-storey building in lower Manhattan in December 2017, but was painted over after a few weeks. However following complaints from neighbouring residents, it was announced a week after being unveiled that the work is to be painted over.

References

External links 
 CV (pdf) - grossestreffen.org

Swedish artists
Living people
1977 births
Swedish graffiti artists